Villandraut is a commune in the Gironde department in Nouvelle-Aquitaine in southwestern France.

Pope Clement V was born in Villandraut. He is known for moving the Curia from Rome to Avignon, ushering in the period known as the Avignon Papacy.

Population

See also
Communes of the Gironde department

References

Communes of Gironde